This is a list of chancellors of the University of Oxford in England by year of appointment.



Chronological list

See also 
List of vice-chancellors of the University of Oxford
List of University of Oxford people
List of chancellors of the University of Cambridge
List of chancellors of the University of London

References 

 Chancellor
History of the University of Oxford
Lists of people associated with the University of Oxford
Oxford
Oxford